State Highway 132, also known as SH-132, is a state highway in north-central Oklahoma. It has no lettered spur routes.

SH-132 was originally added to the state highway system in 1956, when it ran between Carrier and U.S. Route 64 (US-64) east of Nash. It was extended further northward to the Kansas state line in 1958, and southward, to its current southern terminus, in 1962.

Route description

It heads north from there, passing through unincorporated Cato before crossing into Garfield County. The highway then meets U.S. Highway 60/412 west of Enid.

SH-132 turns east and overlaps the U.S. routes for one mile (1.6 km), before splitting back off to the north. In Carrier, it briefly overlaps State Highway 45. North of Carrier, the highway crosses another railroad track, this one operated by Burlington Northern Santa Fe, before running to the west of Hillsdale. At the Garfield–Grant County line, the highway curves to the northwest before turning back to a due north heading in order to line up with Grant County's road grid.

SH-132's first numbered highway junction in Grant County is with US-64. SH-132 turns to the west, overlapping US-64 for  before splitting off to the north in Nash. North of Nash, the highway passes through two sharp curves before crossing over the Salt Fork of the Arkansas River, and through two more sharp curves after the crossing. SH-132 then passes one mile (1.6 km) to the west of unincorporated Hawley. Its final highway junction in Oklahoma is with State Highway 11. From here, the highway continues due north, passing west of Sand Creek, Wakita, and Gibbon en route to Manchester. After passing through Manchester, the highway turns west along the Oklahoma–Kansas state line. The road then curves back to the north, fully entering the state of Kansas, and becomes K-179.

History
SH-132 was first designated on July 14, 1956. Initially, the highway began at what was then SH-38 (present-day SH-45) in Carrier, proceeding north along its present-day route to end at US-64 east of Nash. On May 8, 1958, the portion of the route concurrent with US-64 into Nash, and from Nash to the Kansas state line north of Manchester, was added. The route did not appear on the official state highway map until the 1959 edition. At this time, portions of the route in Grant County, including from the Garfield–Grant county line to US-64 and a segment between Nash and Manchester, were unpaved. By 1961, the segment of highway north of SH-11 had been paved.

On July 2, 1962, SH-132 was extended to the south, reaching its present-day southern terminus. A minor realignment to the highway occurred in southern Grant County on January 7, 1963, the final change to SH-132's route. By 1963, the portion of highway in Grant County south of US-64 was paved, leaving only a section extending from north of Nash to SH-11 as unpaved. This section was paved by 1967.

Junction list

References

External links

SH-132 at OKHighways

132
Transportation in Kingfisher County, Oklahoma
Transportation in Garfield County, Oklahoma
Transportation in Grant County, Oklahoma